, son of regent Nijō Masatsugu, was a Japanese kugyō (court noble) of the Muromachi period (1336–1573). He held a regent position kampaku in 1497. He was the father of regent Nijō Korefusa.

References
 

1471 births
1497 deaths
Fujiwara clan
Hisamoto